5′-Phosphoribosyl-4-carboxy-5-aminoimidazole (or CAIR) is an intermediate in the formation of purines.

It is formed by phosphoribosylaminoimidazole carboxylase.

Nucleotides